"Paracanonical texts" is used by Western scholars to refer to various texts on the fringes of the Pali Canon of Theravada Buddhism (cf. Apocrypha), usually to refer to the following texts sometimes regarded as included in the Pali Canon's Khuddaka Nikaya:

 Suttasamgaha (abbrev. "Suttas"; "Sutta Compendium")
 Nettipakarana (abbrev. "Nett"; "Book of Guidance")
 Petakopadesa (abbrev. "Pe"; "Instructions on the Tipitaka")
 Milindapañha (abbrev. "Mil"; "Questions of Milinda")

The Suttasamgaha includes selected texts primarily from the Pali Canon. The Nettipakarana and the Petakopadesa are introductions to the teachings of Buddhism; these books present methods of interpretation that lead to the knowledge of the good law (saddhamma). Milindapañhā, written in the style of the Pali suttas, contains a dialogue between the Indo-Greek king Menander (in Pāli, Milinda) and the Thera Nāgasena, which illuminates certain important tenets of Buddhism.

The term "paracanonical" is also sometimes applied to the Patimokkha, which is not in the Canon, but a commentary on it, in which most of the text is embedded.

Other terms with similar meanings include "semi-canonical" and "quasi-canonical".

History
The Suttasamgaha is believed to have been composed in Anurādhapura, Sri Lanka.

In Burma, presumably sometime after the closing of the Abhidhamma Pitaka (ca. 200 CE), the paracanonical texts were added to the Khuddaka Nikaya.

The Suttasamgaha was included in the 1888 Burmese Piakat samui, but excluded from the 1956 Burmese Chaasagāyana edition possibly due to the Suttasamgaha's inclusion of material from the post-canonical Pali commentaries. The Burmese Fifth Council inscriptions of the Canon include the same three works.  The Burmese Phayre manuscript of the Canon, dated 1841/2, includes the Netti. 

The Nettipakarana, Petakopadesa and Milindapañha appear in the Khuddaka Nikaya of the Burmese Tipitaka, while the Nettipakarana and the Petakopadesa appear in the Sinhalese printed edition. 
 
The head of the Burmese sangha two centuries ago regarded at least the Netti and Petakopadesa as canonical. A modern Burmese teacher has described them as post-canonical.

Nettipakarana

The Nettipakarana (Pāli: -pakarana: The Guide), Nettippakarana, or just Netti, is a Buddhist scripture, sometimes included in the Khuddaka Nikaya of Theravada Buddhism's Pāli Canon.

Translation: The Guide, tr Nanamoli, 1962, Pali Text Society, Bristol.

The nature of the Netti is a matter of some disagreement among scholars. The translator supported by Professor George Bond of Northwestern University, holds that it is a guide to help those who already understand the teachings and present them to others. A. K. Warder, Professor Emeritus of Sanskrit at the University of Toronto, disagrees, maintaining that it covers all aspects of interpretation, not just this one.

The Netti itself says that the Buddha's disciple methods were taught by Kaccana (also Katyayana or Kaccayana), and the colophon says that he composed the book, that Buddha had approved, and that it was recited at the First Council. Scholars do not take this literally, but the translator admits the methods may go back to him. The translator holds that the book is a revised edition of the Petakopadesa, though Professor von Hinüber has questioned this idea. Scholars generally date it somewhere around the beginning of the Common Era.

Petakopadesa

The Petakopadesa (petakopadesa: "Pitaka-Disclosure") is a Buddhist scripture, sometimes included in the Pāli Canon of Theravada Buddhism.

Translation: Pitaka-Disclosure, tr Nanamoli, 1964, Pali Text Society, Bristol.

The text of the book as handed down in manuscript is very corrupt. This book was regarded as canonical by the head of the Burmese sangha about two centuries ago. It is included in the inscriptions of the Canon approved by the Burmese Fifth Council and in the printed edition of the Sixth Council text. 

The Petakopadesa deals with the textual and the exegetical methodology. It is nothing but a different manipulation of the subject-matter discussed in the Nettipakarana. In some places there are quotations from the Tipitaka. B.C. Law says, “its importance lies also in the fact that in places it has quoted the Pāli canonical passages mentioning the sources by such names as Samyuttaka (Samyutta Nikāya) and Ekuttaraka (Ekuttara or Anguttara Nikāya)”. The Petakopadesa describes the cattāri ariyasaccāni or the Four Noble Truths as the central theme or the essence of Buddhism.

Milindapañhā

The Milindapanha (also -pañha or -pañhā) is a Buddhist scripture, sometimes included in the Pāli Canon of Theravada Buddhism as a book of the Khuddaka Nikaya. It is in the form of a dialogue between King Menander I (or Milinda) of Bactria, who reigned in the second century BCE, and a monk named Nagasena, not independently known.

Rhys Davids says it is the greatest work of classical Indian prose, though Moritz Winternit says this is true only of the earlier parts, it being generally accepted by scholars that the work is composite, with additions made over some time. In support of this, it is noted that the Chinese versions of the work are substantially shorter. The book is included in the inscriptions of the Canon approved by the Burmese Fifth Council and the printed edition of the Sixth Council text,
the Milindapañhā. This work is revered and is one of the most popular and authoritative works of Pāli Buddhism.

What is most interesting about the Milindapañhā is that it is the product of the encounter of two great civilizations - Hellenistic Greece and Buddhist India - and is thus of continuing relevance as the wisdom of the East meets the modern Western world. King Milinda poses questions about dilemmas raised by Buddhist philosophy that we might ask today, and Nāgasena's responses are full of wisdom, wit, and helpful analogies.

See also 
 Tipitaka
 Khuddaka Nikaya
 Anupitaka

Notes

Sources 
 Hinüber, Oskar von (1996; pbk. ed. 2000). A Handbook of Pāli Literature. Berlin: Walter de Gruyter. .
 Malalasekera, G.P. (1937–38). Dictionary of Pāli Proper Names . Pali Text Society.  Retrieved 2008-07-11 from "What the Buddha said in plain English!" at http://what-buddha-said.net/library/DPPN/index_dict.ppn.htm.

Tripiṭaka
Pali Buddhist texts
 Para